Events from the year 1702 in France

Incumbents
 Monarch – Louis XIV

Events

1 February – Battle of Cremona
16 June to 12 September – Siege of Landau
15 August – Battle of Luzzara
14 October – Battle of Friedlingen
23 October – Battle of Vigo Bay.

Births
4 October – Honoré Armand de Villars, nobleman, soldier and politician (died 1770)

Deaths
22 April – François Charpentier, archaeologist (born 1620)
27 May – Dominique Bouhours, Jesuit priest, essayist and grammarian (born 1628)
16 July – Nicolas Lebègue, composer (born c.1631)
15 August – Charles, Prince of Commercy, field marshal (born 1661)
16 September – Armand de Camboust, duc de Coislin, military officer (born 1635)
8 December – Chevalier de Lorraine, nobleman (born 1643)

See also

References

1700s in France